Twin Star Exorcists is a Japanese manga series written and illustrated by Yoshiaki Sukeno. Sukeno began serializing the manga in Shueisha's Jump Square magazine on October 4, 2013. A special chapter was published in Weekly Shōnen Jump in April 2016.

Viz Media licensed the series for publication in North America, with the first volume released on July 7, 2015.

The series has also spawned two spin-off series and three light novels.

Volume list

Chapters not yet in tankōbon format
39.1. "Special Chapter: Awaken Mayura's Dormant Fangs!!"
49.1. "Mattress Extra"
115. 
116. 
117.

Spin-off manga
The first spin-off manga series, Sōsei no Onmyōji: SD Nyoritsuryō!! (双星の陰陽師 SD如律令!!) is a comedy spin-off comic, written by koppy and supervised by Yoshiaki Sukeno. It was published at the official website of the original manga, as well as the magazine Saikyō Jump. The content of this manga is canon, showing personalities of many characters. The compiled volume was published and released on March 3, 2017 in Japan.

The second spin-off manga series,  is a manga adaptation of the light novel, "Sōsei no Onmyōji: Tenen Jakko", written and illustrated by the same authors. The back-story focuses on the characters, Seigen Amawaka and Yukari Otomi. The spin-off series was launched by Yoshiaki Sukeno on Shueisha's Shonen Jump+ website on September 3, 2018. The compiled volume was published and released on December 4, 2018 in Japan.

Light novels
As of December 2018, three light novel adaptations have been published and released by Shueisha under its JUMP j-BOOKS imprint. Each novel features a back-story from the perspective of different characters from the main series, serving as prologues to the main story. The light novels are written by Hajime Tanaka and supervised by Yoshiaki Sukeno.

References

Twin Star Exorcists